Aleksey Nikolayevich Nuzhnyy, real surname is Chernomazov (born 16 June 1984) is a Russian film director, screenwriter, producer and actor.

Biography

Early life
Nuzhnyy was born in Yoshkar-Ola, Russian SFSR, Soviet Union (now Russia), studied at the New York Film Academy.

In 2012, Aleksey Nuzhnyy loudly announced himself with a short film Envelope with Kevin Spacey in the title role, where he acted as a screenwriter and director. The film became one of the winners of the Jameson First Shot competition when the film appeared on the Internet - it was watched by more than a million people. After filming, Kevin Spacey called Aleksey a genius and advised domestic producers to pay attention to him. The film The Rooster (ru), released in 2015, received the main prize of the International Street Cinema Festival (ru), the prize for the best screenplay at the Shorter Festival and the Grand Prix of the VideoLike Film Festival.

Filmography (selected)
 Yolki 6 (2017)
 I Am Losing Weight (2018)
 Loud Connection (2019)
 Obratnaya svyaz (2020)
 Fire (2020)
 Couple from the Future (2021)
 Birth of the Empire (2023)

References

External links 

 
 Aleksey Nuzhnyy on kino-teatr.ru

Living people
1984 births
People from Yoshkar-Ola
Russian film directors
Russian screenwriters
Russian producers